James Sloan McInnes (17 February 1912 – 5 May 1965) was a Scottish footballer who played as a wing half for Liverpool in the English Football League.

Born in Ayrshire, McInnes started his senior career at Third Lanark, winning the 1934–35 Scottish Division Two title and playing on the losing side in the 1936 Scottish Cup Final before he moved to England to play for Liverpool in March 1938. He made 11 appearances at the end of the 1937–38 season, appeared 34 times the following season, and played three times in the 1939–40 season which was suspended following the outbreak of the Second World War. He never played an official competitive match for the club again and retired in 1946 joining the club's administrative staff.

McInnes killed himself at Liverpool's home ground, Anfield, in 1965. He had become overwhelmed at the size of the job that he faced as the club grew in stature, and hanged himself from a beam at the rear of the Spion Kop.

References

1912 births
1965 deaths
Scottish footballers
Liverpool F.C. players
Third Lanark A.C. players
English Football League players
Association football wing halves
Scottish Football League players
Brighton & Hove Albion F.C. wartime guest players
Newcastle United F.C. wartime guest players
York City F.C. wartime guest players
Leeds United F.C. wartime guest players
Luton Town F.C. wartime guest players
Millwall F.C. wartime guest players
Queens Park Rangers F.C. wartime guest players
Lisburn Distillery F.C. wartime guest players
Manchester United F.C. wartime guest players
Suicides by hanging in England
Liverpool F.C. non-playing staff
Scottish Junior Football Association players
Footballers from North Ayrshire
People from Kilwinning